Zła Wieś  is a village in the administrative district of Gmina Trąbki Wielkie, within Gdańsk County, Pomeranian Voivodeship, in northern Poland. It is located within the historic region of Pomerania.

The village had a population of 141(as of 2008).
Zła Wieś was a private church village of the monastery in Ląd, administratively located in the Tczew County in the Pomeranian Voivodeship of the Polish Crown.

Transport
The Polish A1 motorway runs nearby, east of the village.

References

Villages in Gdańsk County